Come Alive is Daniel Ash's first solo live album and was recorded in early 2002 at The Galaxy Theater in Santa Ana, California, and Slim's in San Francisco, California. The setlist features songs from Ash's time with Love and Rockets, Tones on Tail and Bauhaus as well as his solo career.

Track listing 
 Come Alive
 Trouble
 Walk on the Moon
 Get Out of Control
 Sweet FA
 Spooky
 So Alive
 Ghost Writer
 Christian Says
 Mirror People
 Slice of Life
 An American Dream
 Coming Down
 OK This Is the Pops
 Go

Performers:
Daniel Ash: Guitar and Vocals,
John Desalvo: Drums,
Mike Peoples: Bass

Daniel Ash albums
2005 live albums